Ramesh Mantri (1927–1997) was a Marathi writer primarily of humor from Maharashtra, India.

He attended Rajaram College in Kolhapur from where he graduated. He also spent some time in the UK in connection with higher education on a Commonwealth programme.

He was employed with the United States Information Service (USIS) in Mumbai India in 1960s.

Mantri presided over Marathi Sahitya Sammelan at Kolhapur in 1992.

He was married and had 3 children.

He created a fictional character Janu Bande which was a caricature of James Bond and a few short stories involving that character.

Literary works
The following is a partial list of Mantri's books:

 
 
 
 
 
 
 
 
 
 
 
 
  
 
 
 
 
  
  (005 ) 

1927 births
1997 deaths
Marathi-language writers
People from Kolhapur
Presidents of the Akhil Bharatiya Marathi Sahitya Sammelan